Forgive Me is the second studio album by Swedish Muslim singer-songwriter Maher Zain and was released on April 1, 2012, by Awakening Records. The album was a commercial success; it sold over 100,000 copies and went seven-times Platinum in Malaysia as of June 2016.

Music videos
The first music video from the album was for the song "Freedom". It was released on March 27, 2011, by Malaysian director Mohd Hafizi bin Mat Khalib. The music video was filmed on February 25 & 26, 2011, at Malawati Stadium, Malaysia.
The second music video from the album was for the song "Number One For Me". It was released on March 15, 2012. The video was directed by Mike Harris, who had previously directed "Insha Allah" from the album Thank You Allah. The "Number One For Me" music video was released via iTunes on March 13, 2012. Performers in the video include child actor Massimo Loreti.
The third music video entitled "So Soon", was released on June 3, 2012. It was directed by Mike Harris.
The fourth music video was released on January 9, 2014, titled "Muhammad (pbuh)".

Track listing
The full track list was announced on iTunes on April 2, 2012.

References

2012 albums
Arabic-language albums
Maher Zain albums
Awakening Music albums